Walnut Ridge High School may refer to:

 Walnut Ridge High School (Arkansas), located in Walnut Ridge, Arkansas.
 Walnut Ridge High School (Columbus, Ohio), located in Columbus, Ohio.